2016–17 Młoda Liga was the 7th season of Młoda Liga (league under-23) organized by Professional Volleyball League SA under the supervision of Polish Volleyball Federation. 

Two the best teams from 2016–17 Młoda Liga were qualified to Final Four of Polish Championship U23. In Final Four RCS Cerrad Czarni Radom beat BBTS Bielsko-Biała in the finale and achieved second title of Polish Champion under-23. Tomasz Fornal, outside hitter from RCS Cerrad Czarni Radom was awarded a title of the Most Valuable Player.

Squads

Regular season

Play-offs

Final Four
To Final Four of Polish Championship under-23 tournament were qualified two the best teams from 2016–17 Młoda Liga and two teams from PZPS competition.

Semifinals

|}

Bronze medal match

|}

Finale

|}

Final standing

Dream Team line-up
The coaches of the participating teams and the Młoda Liga coordinators selected the best six and the libero of the season.

Most Valuable Player
 Tomasz Fornal (RCS Cerrad Czarni Radom)
Best Setter
 Michał Szczechowicz (Łuczniczka Bydgoszcz)
Best Outside Spikers
 Tomasz Fornal (RCS Cerrad Czarni Radom)
 Justin Ziółkowski (ZAKSA Kędzierzyn-Koźle)

Best Middle Blockers
 Jakub Zwiech (RCS Cerrad Czarni Radom)
 Mateusz Siwicki (Łuczniczka Bydgoszcz)
Best Opposite Spiker
 Bartłomiej Bołądź (RCS Cerrad Czarni Radom)
Best Libero
 Przemysław Stąsiek (PGE Skra Bełchatów)

References

External links
Official website

Młoda Liga
2016 in volleyball
2017 in men's volleyball
Poland U23